The term holding current may refer to:

 Holding current (electronics) is the minimum current which must pass through the device in order for it to remain in the 'ON' state 
 Holding voltage (physiology), in electrophysiology, specifically while voltage clamping a cell, the holding current is the current that is passed into the cell in order to hold it at the command potential